Clement Keys (1864 – 22 November 1937) was an English football secretary-manager for West Bromwich Albion from 1895 to 1896. 

He was born in Derby, Derbyshire, and played amateur football for Albion as a goalie. He later became a chartered accountant, founding the firm Clement Keys & Sons. He was borough accountant for West Bromwich. He was also active as a Freemason; he was Master of the Dartmouth Lodge and Sandwell Lodge of Freemasons and was Assistant Standard-bearer of the United Grand Lodge of England. He died in Birmingham, aged 73.

References

External links

 

1864 births
1937 deaths
Sportspeople from Derby
English football managers
West Bromwich Albion F.C. managers
English Freemasons
English accountants